2.5,  2½ or two and a half may refer to:

Technology
Version 2.5 or v2.5, a designation used in software versioning
2.5D, or 3/4 perspective and pseudo-3D, an attempt to render 3-dimensional images in 2-dimensions
2.5D (machining), technique used in machining to project a plane into 3rd dimension
2.5D (visual perception), effect in visual perception where the 3D environment of the observer is projected onto the 2D planes of the retinas
2.5G phone network; see 2G
2.5-millimeter band

Culture
Two and a Half Men, American television sitcom
Hood Hop 2.5, 2009 album by J-Kwon
Jackass 2.5, a 2007 direct-to-video feature; see Jackass Number Two
Proposition 2½, Massachusetts statute which limits property tax increases by municipalities

See also
2.5D (disambiguation)